In mathematics, cobordism is a fundamental  equivalence relation on the class of compact manifolds of the same dimension, set up using the concept of the boundary (French bord, giving cobordism) of a manifold. Two manifolds of the same dimension are cobordant if their disjoint union is the boundary of a compact manifold one dimension higher.

The boundary of an (n + 1)-dimensional manifold W is an n-dimensional manifold ∂W that is closed, i.e., with empty boundary. In general, a closed manifold need not be a boundary: cobordism theory is the study of the difference between all closed manifolds and those that are boundaries. The theory was originally developed by René Thom for smooth manifolds (i.e., differentiable), but there are now also versions for
piecewise linear and topological manifolds.

A cobordism between manifolds M and N is a compact manifold W whose boundary is the disjoint union of M and N, .

Cobordisms are studied both for the equivalence relation that they generate, and as objects in their own right. Cobordism is a much coarser equivalence relation than diffeomorphism or homeomorphism of manifolds, and is significantly easier to study and compute. It is not possible to classify manifolds up to diffeomorphism or homeomorphism in dimensions ≥ 4 – because the word problem for groups cannot be solved – but it is possible to classify manifolds up to cobordism. Cobordisms are central objects of study in geometric topology and algebraic topology. In geometric topology, cobordisms are intimately connected with Morse theory, and h-cobordisms are fundamental in the study of high-dimensional manifolds, namely surgery theory. In algebraic topology, cobordism theories are fundamental extraordinary cohomology theories, and categories of cobordisms are the domains of topological quantum field theories.

Definition

Manifolds
Roughly speaking, an n-dimensional manifold M is a topological space locally (i.e., near each point) homeomorphic to an open subset of Euclidean space  A manifold with boundary is similar, except that a point of M is allowed to have a neighborhood that is homeomorphic to an open subset of the half-space

Finally, a closed manifold is, by definition, a compact manifold without boundary (.)

Cobordisms
An -dimensional cobordism is a quintuple  consisting of an -dimensional compact differentiable manifold with boundary, ; closed  -manifolds  , ; and embeddings ,  with disjoint images such that

M and N are called cobordant if such a cobordism exists. All manifolds cobordant to a fixed given manifold M form the cobordism class of M.

Every closed manifold M is the boundary of the non-compact manifold M × [0, 1); for this reason we require W to be compact in the definition of cobordism. Note however that W is not required to be connected; as a consequence, if M = ∂W1 and N = ∂W2, then M and N are cobordant.

Examples
The simplest example of a cobordism is the unit interval . It is a 1-dimensional cobordism between the 0-dimensional manifolds {0}, {1}. More generally, for any closed manifold M, is a cobordism from M × {0} to M × {1}.

If M consists of a circle, and N of two circles, M and N together make up the boundary of a pair of pants W (see the figure at right). Thus the pair of pants is a cobordism between M and N. A simpler cobordism between M and N is given by the disjoint union of three disks.

Terminology
An n-manifold M is called null-cobordant if there is a cobordism between M and the empty manifold; in other words, if M is the entire boundary of some (n + 1)-manifold. For example, the circle is null-cobordant since it bounds a disk. More generally, a n-sphere is null-cobordant since it bounds a (n + 1)-disk. Also, every orientable surface is null-cobordant, because it is the boundary of a handlebody. On the other hand, the 2n-dimensional real projective space  is a (compact) closed manifold that is not the boundary of a manifold, as is explained below.

The general bordism problem is to calculate the cobordism classes of manifolds subject to various conditions.

Null-cobordisms with additional structure are called fillings. Bordism and cobordism are used by some authors interchangeably; others distinguish them. When one wishes to distinguish the study of cobordism classes from the study of cobordisms as objects in their own right, one calls the equivalence question bordism of manifolds, and the study of cobordisms as objects cobordisms of manifolds.

The term bordism comes from French , meaning boundary. Hence bordism is the study of boundaries. Cobordism means "jointly bound", so M and N are cobordant if they jointly bound a manifold; i.e., if their disjoint union is a boundary. Further, cobordism groups form an extraordinary cohomology theory, hence the co-.

Variants
The above is the most basic form of the definition. It is also referred to as unoriented bordism. In many situations, the manifolds in question are oriented, or carry some other additional structure referred to as G-structure. This gives rise to "oriented cobordism" and "cobordism with G-structure", respectively. Under favourable technical conditions these form a graded ring called the cobordism ring , with grading by dimension, addition by disjoint union and multiplication by cartesian product. The cobordism groups  are the coefficient groups of a generalised homology theory.

When there is additional structure, the notion of cobordism must be formulated more precisely: a G-structure on W restricts to a G-structure on M and N. The basic examples are G = O for unoriented cobordism, G = SO for oriented cobordism, and G = U for complex cobordism using stably complex manifolds. Many more are detailed by Robert E. Stong.

In a similar vein, a standard tool in surgery theory is surgery on normal maps: such a process changes a normal map to another normal map within the same bordism class.

Instead of considering additional structure, it is also possible to take into account various notions of manifold, especially piecewise linear (PL) and topological manifolds. This gives rise to bordism groups , which are harder to compute than the differentiable variants.

Surgery construction

Now, given a manifold M of dimension n = p + q and an embedding  define the n-manifold

The trace of the surgery

defines an elementary cobordism (W; M, N). Note that M is obtained from N by surgery on  This is called reversing the surgery.

Every cobordism is a union of elementary cobordisms, by the work of Marston Morse, René Thom and John Milnor.

Examples

For surgery on the 2-sphere, there are more possibilities, since we can start by cutting out either  or

Morse functions
Suppose that f is a Morse function on an (n + 1)-dimensional manifold, and suppose that c is a critical value with exactly one critical point in its preimage. If the index of this critical point is p + 1, then the level-set N := f−1(c + ε) is obtained from M := f−1(c − ε) by a p-surgery. The inverse image W := f−1([c − ε, c + ε]) defines a cobordism (W; M, N) that can be identified with the trace of this surgery.

Geometry, and the connection with Morse theory and handlebodies
Given a cobordism (W; M, N) there exists a smooth function f : W → [0, 1] such that f−1(0) = M, f−1(1) = N.  By general position, one can assume f is Morse and such that all critical points occur in the interior of W. In this setting f is called a Morse function on a cobordism. The cobordism (W; M, N) is a union of the traces of a sequence of surgeries on M, one for each critical point of f. The manifold W is obtained from M × [0, 1] by attaching one handle for each critical point of f.

The Morse/Smale theorem states that for a Morse function on a cobordism, the flowlines of f′ give rise to a handle presentation of the triple (W; M, N). Conversely, given a handle decomposition of a cobordism, it comes from a suitable Morse function. In a suitably normalized setting this process gives a correspondence between handle decompositions and Morse functions on a cobordism.

History
Cobordism had its roots in the (failed) attempt by Henri Poincaré in 1895 to define homology purely in terms of manifolds . Poincaré simultaneously defined both homology and cobordism, which are not the same, in general. See Cobordism as an extraordinary cohomology theory for the relationship between bordism and homology.

Bordism was explicitly introduced by Lev Pontryagin in geometric work on manifolds. It came to prominence when René Thom showed that cobordism groups could be computed by means of homotopy theory, via the Thom complex construction. Cobordism theory became part of the apparatus of extraordinary cohomology theory, alongside K-theory. It performed an important role, historically speaking, in developments in topology in the 1950s and early 1960s, in particular in the Hirzebruch–Riemann–Roch theorem, and in the first proofs of the Atiyah–Singer index theorem.

In the 1980s the category with compact manifolds as objects and cobordisms between these as morphisms played a basic role in the Atiyah–Segal axioms for topological quantum field theory, which is an important part of quantum topology.

Categorical aspects
Cobordisms are objects of study in their own right, apart from cobordism classes. Cobordisms form a category whose objects are closed manifolds and whose morphisms are cobordisms. Roughly speaking, composition is given by gluing together cobordisms end-to-end: the composition of (W; M, N) and (W ′; N, P) is defined by gluing the right end of the first to the left end of the second, yielding (W ′ ∪N W; M, P). A cobordism is a kind of cospan: M → W ← N.  The category is a dagger compact category.

A topological quantum field theory is a monoidal functor from a category of cobordisms to a category of vector spaces. That is, it is a functor whose value on a disjoint union of manifolds is equivalent to the tensor product of its values on each of the constituent manifolds.

In low dimensions, the bordism question is relatively trivial, but the category of cobordism is not. For instance, the disk bounding the circle corresponds to a nullary (0-ary) operation, while the cylinder corresponds to a 1-ary operation and the pair of pants to a binary operation.

Unoriented cobordism

More specifically, if [M] and [N] denote the cobordism classes of the manifolds M and N respectively, we define ; this is a well-defined operation which turns  into an abelian group. The identity element of this group is the class  consisting of all closed n-manifolds which are boundaries. Further we have  for every M since . The cartesian product of manifolds defines a multiplication  so

is a graded algebra, with the grading given by the dimension.

The cobordism class  of a closed unoriented n-dimensional manifold M is determined by the Stiefel–Whitney characteristic numbers of M, which depend on the stable isomorphism class of the tangent bundle. Thus if M has a stably trivial tangent bundle then . In 1954 René Thom proved

the polynomial algebra with one generator  in each dimension . Thus two unoriented closed n-dimensional manifolds M, N are cobordant,  if and only if for each collection  of k-tuples of integers  such that  the Stiefel-Whitney numbers are equal

with  the ith Stiefel-Whitney class and  the -coefficient fundamental class.

For even i it is possible to choose , the cobordism class of the i-dimensional real projective space.

The low-dimensional unoriented cobordism groups are

This shows, for example, that every 3-dimensional closed manifold is the boundary of a 4-manifold (with boundary).

The Euler characteristic  modulo 2 of an unoriented manifold M is an unoriented cobordism invariant. This is implied by the equation

for any compact manifold with boundary .

Therefore,  is a well-defined group homomorphism. For example, for any 

In particular such a product of real projective spaces is not null-cobordant. The mod 2 Euler characteristic map  is onto for all  and a group isomorphism for 

Cobordism of manifolds with additional structure
Cobordism can also be defined for manifolds that have additional structure, notably an orientation. This is made formal in a general way using the notion of X-structure (or G-structure). Very briefly, the normal bundle ν of an immersion of M into a sufficiently high-dimensional Euclidean space  gives rise to a map from M to the Grassmannian, which in turn is a subspace of the classifying space of the orthogonal group: ν: M → Gr(n, n + k) → BO(k). Given a collection of spaces and maps Xk → Xk+1 with maps Xk → BO(k) (compatible with the inclusions BO(k) → BO(k+1), an X-structure is a lift of ν to a map . Considering only manifolds and cobordisms with X-structure gives rise to a more general notion of cobordism. In particular, Xk may be given by BG(k), where G(k) → O(k) is some group homomorphism. This is referred to as a G-structure. Examples include G = O, the orthogonal group, giving back the unoriented cobordism, but also the subgroup SO(k), giving rise to oriented cobordism, the spin group, the unitary group U(k), and the trivial group, giving rise to framed cobordism.

The resulting cobordism groups are then defined analogously to the unoriented case.

Oriented cobordism

Oriented cobordism is the one of manifolds with an SO-structure. For example, boundary of the cylinder M × I is : both ends have opposite orientations. It is also the correct definition in the sense of extraordinary cohomology theory.

Unlike in the unoriented cobordism group, where every element is two-torsion, 2M is not in general an oriented boundary, that is, 2[M] ≠ 0 when considered in 

The oriented cobordism groups are given modulo torsion by

the polynomial algebra generated by the oriented cobordism classes

of the complex projective spaces (Thom, 1952). The oriented cobordism group  is determined by the Stiefel–Whitney and Pontrjagin characteristic numbers (Wall, 1960). Two oriented manifolds are oriented cobordant if and only if their Stiefel–Whitney and Pontrjagin numbers are the same.

The low-dimensional oriented cobordism groups are :

For example, for any i1, ..., ik ≥ 1

The signature map  is onto for all i ≥ 1, and an isomorphism for i = 1.

Cobordism as an extraordinary cohomology theory
Every vector bundle theory (real, complex etc.) has an extraordinary cohomology theory called K-theory. Similarly, every cobordism theory ΩG has an extraordinary cohomology theory, with homology ("bordism") groups  and cohomology ("cobordism") groups  for any space X. The generalized homology groups  are covariant in X, and the generalized cohomology groups  are contravariant in X. The cobordism groups defined above are, from this point of view, the homology groups of a point: . Then  is the group of bordism classes of pairs (M, f) with M a closed n-dimensional manifold M (with G-structure) and f : M → X a map. Such pairs (M, f), (N, g) are bordant if there exists a G-cobordism (W; M, N) with a map h : W → X, which restricts to f on M, and to g on N.

which is far from being an isomorphism in general.

The bordism and cobordism theories of a space satisfy the Eilenberg–Steenrod axioms apart from the dimension axiom.  This does not mean that the groups   can be effectively computed once one knows the cobordism theory of a point and the homology of the space X, though the Atiyah–Hirzebruch spectral sequence gives a starting point for calculations. The computation is only easy if the particular cobordism theory reduces to a product of ordinary homology theories, in which case the bordism groups are the ordinary homology groups

This is true for unoriented cobordism. Other cobordism theories do not reduce to ordinary homology in this way, notably framed cobordism, oriented cobordism  and complex cobordism.  The last-named theory in particular is much used by algebraic topologists as a computational tool (e.g., for the homotopy groups of spheres).

Cobordism theories are represented by Thom spectra MG: given a group G, the Thom spectrum is composed from the Thom spaces MGn of the standard vector bundles over the classifying spaces BGn. Note that even for similar groups, Thom spectra can be very different: MSO and MO are very different, reflecting the difference between oriented and unoriented cobordism.

From the point of view of spectra, unoriented cobordism is a product of Eilenberg–MacLane spectra – MO = H(∗(MO)) – while oriented cobordism is a product of Eilenberg–MacLane spectra rationally, and at 2, but not at odd primes: the oriented cobordism spectrum MSO is rather more complicated than MO.

See also
h-cobordism
Link concordance
List of cohomology theories
Symplectic filling
Cobordism hypothesis
Cobordism ring
Timeline of bordism

Notes

References
John Frank Adams, Stable homotopy and generalised homology, Univ. Chicago Press (1974).

Michael F. Atiyah, Bordism and cobordism Proc. Camb. Phil. Soc. 57, pp. 200–208 (1961).

Sergei Novikov, Methods of algebraic topology from the point of view of cobordism theory, Izv. Akad. Nauk SSSR Ser. Mat. 31 (1967), 855–951.
Lev Pontryagin, Smooth manifolds and their applications in homotopy theory American Mathematical Society Translations, Ser. 2, Vol. 11, pp. 1–114 (1959).
Daniel Quillen, On the formal group laws of unoriented and complex cobordism theory Bull. Amer. Math. Soc., 75 (1969) pp. 1293–1298.
Douglas Ravenel, Complex cobordism and stable homotopy groups of spheres, Acad. Press (1986).

Yuli B. Rudyak, On Thom spectra, orientability, and (co)bordism, Springer (2008).
 Robert E. Stong, Notes on cobordism theory, Princeton Univ. Press (1968).

 René Thom, Quelques propriétés globales des variétés différentiables, Commentarii Mathematici Helvetici 28, 17-86 (1954).

External links 
 Bordism on the Manifold Atlas.
 B-Bordism on the Manifold Atlas.

Differential topology
Algebraic topology
Surgery theory